The Battle of Monte Castello (part of Operation Encore) was an engagement that took place from 25 November 1944 to 21 February 1945 during the Italian campaign of World War II. It was fought between the Allied forces advancing into northern Italy and the dug-in German defenders. The battle marked the Brazilian Expeditionary Force's entry into the land war in Europe. Starting in November 1944, fierce combat dragged on for three months, ending on 21 February 1945. Six Allied attacks were mounted against the German forces, four of which were tactical failures.

Location

Operation
In November 1944, the 1st Expeditionary Division of the Brazilian Army (DIE) deviated from the battle front Serchio River, where it had been fighting for two months ahead of the Rino River, on the Northern Apennine Mountains. General Mascarenhas de Moraes had established his forward headquarters in the town of Porretta Terme, which was in front of the mountains under German control.

German artillery positions were considered privileged, subjecting the Allies to constant vigilance, hindering any progress towards Bologna and Po Valley. Estimates were that the winter would be harsh, complicating the situation that had already degenerated due to the rains and bombing, turning the roads into quagmires.

Despite the situation, General Mark Clark, Commander of Allied Forces in Italy, through the troops of IV Corps (of which the Brazilian division was part), had planned to free the 8th British Army's path towards Bologna, before the first snows began to fall.

German forces
The Italian front was under the responsibility of Army Group C, under the command of General Oberst Heinrich von Vietinghoff. He controlled the German 10th and 14th armies and the "Army of Liguria," the latter defending the border with France. The 14th was composed of the 14th Panzer Corps and the 51st Mountain Corps. Within the 51st Corps was the 232nd Grenadier Division (Infantry), under General Eccard von Gablenz, a veteran of Stalingrad. The 232nd was activated on 22 June 1944 and was formed of veterans who were wounded convalescents from the Russian front; it was classified as a "Static Division." It consisted of three infantry regiments (1043°, 1044° and 1045°), each with only two battalions, plus a battalion of marines (reconnaissance battalion) and an artillery regiment with four groups, and smaller units. This totaled about 9,000 men. The age of the troops ranged between 17 and 40 years, with the younger and abler soldiers concentrated in the marine battalion. During the final battle, it was reinforced by the 4th Mountain Battalion (Mittenwald), which was kept in reserve. The veterans who defended this position did not have the same enthusiasm they had when the war began, but were still willing to fulfill their duty.

The attack

It was the responsibility of the Brazilians to win the most combative sectors of the entire Apennine front, but the 1st DIE was too inexperienced a troop to face a fight of that magnitude. Therefore, as Clark's goal was to take Bologna before Christmas, training had to be accomplished in practice, that is, in combat.

Accordingly, on 24 November, the Reconnaissance Squadron and the 3rd Battalion, 6th Infantry Regiment of the 1st DIE joined U.S. Task Force 45 for a first foray to Monte Castello.

On the second day of attacks, it appeared that the operation would be successful. U.S. troops reached the crest of Monte Castello after capturing neighboring Mount Belvedere.

However, in a powerful counteroffensive, the men of the German 232nd Infantry Division, responsible for defending Monte Castello and Monte Della Torraca, regained the lost positions, forcing the Brazilian and American soldiers to abandon the positions already won – with the exception of Mount Belvedere. On 29 November, a second attack was planned on the hill. This counter-offensive attacking formation was almost entirely the work of the 1st DIE – with three battalions – with only the support of three platoons of American tanks. Meanwhile, an unexpected event occurred on the eve of the attack which undermined Allied plans: on the night of the 28th, the Germans made a counter-attack on Mount Belvedere, taking the Americans' position and leaving the left Allied flank uncovered.

DIE initially considered postponing the attack, but as the troops had occupied their positions and the strategy had been maintained, at 7 o'clock a new attempt was made.

The weather proved extremely severe: rain and overcast skies prevented any support by the Air Force and mud practically precluded the participation of tanks. The grouping of General Zenóbio da Costa at first got a good head start, but the German counter-attack was violent. German soldiers of the 1,043rd, 1044th and 1045th Infantry Regiments blocked the advances of the soldiers. By late afternoon, the two Brazilian battalions were back to square one.

On 5 December, Gen. Mascarenhas received an order from the 4th Corps: "The 1st DIE is to capture and hold the summit of Monte Della Torraca – Monte Belvedere." That is, after two unsuccessful attempts, Monte Castello was still the main goal of the next offensive of the Brazilians, which had been postponed for a week.

But on 12 December 1944, the transaction was effected, which date would be remembered by the FEB as one of the most violent faced by Brazilian troops in the theater of operations in Italy. With the same weather conditions prevailing as before the onslaught, the 2nd and 3rd battalions of the 1st Infantry Regiment needed help. Some positions were won, but with losses caused by German artillery fire. Again the attempt at conquest proved fruitless, and caused 150 casualties, leaving 20 Brazilian soldiers dead. The lesson served to reinforce Mascarenhas' conviction that Monte Castello could only be taken if the entire division was used in the attack – and not just a few battalions, as the 5th Army had ordered.

Only on 18 February 1945, after the winter weather improved, did the command of the 5th Army determine a new offensive, called Operation Encore to defeat the compound of defensive positions, formed by the Germans around mounts and locations of Monte Castello, Belvedere, Della Toraccia, Castelnuovo (di Vergato), Torre di Nerone and Castel D'Aiano, which had proved extremely resistant. It would use troops of the 1st Brazilian Division, and of the newly arrived US 10th Mountain Division.

The final attack

The final attack, dubbed Operation Encore, employed the Brazilians to win the Mount and consequently expel the Germans. The tactics used were to be the same as those devised by Mascarenhas de Moraes in November. On 20 February the troops of the Brazilian Expeditionary Force were in battle position, with its three regiments ready to depart for Castello. Advancing to the left of the Brazilians was the elite American 10th Mountain Division, which had the responsibility of taking Monte della Torraca and so protecting the most vulnerable flank of the sector.

The final attack on Castello began at 6 am, 21 February, with the Uzeda Battalion followed on the right, the Franklin Battalion toward the front, with Sizeno Sarmento Mountain Battalion waiting in the privileged positions they had achieved during the night to join the other two battalions. As outlined in the plans for Encore, the Brazilians were to reach the top of Monte Castello by 18.00 hours at most – one hour after the Monte della Torraca was won for the 10th Mountain Division, an event scheduled for 17.00 hours. The 4th Corps was confident that Monte Castello would not be taken before Della Torraca.

However, at 17.30, when the first Battalion of the 1st Regiment Franklin conquered the summit of Monte Castello, the Americans had not overcome the German resistance. They would only accomplish this during the night, when the pracinhas had long completed their mission and begun to take up a position in the newly conquered trenches and bunkers. Much of the success of the offensive was credited to the Artillery Division commanded by General Cordeiro de Farias that between 16.00 and 17.00 on the 22nd had made a perfect barrage against the summit of Monte Castello, allowing the movement of Brazilian troops.

Bibliography
Baumgardner, Randy W. "10th Mountain Division" Turner Publishing Co. 
Böhmler, Rudolf. "Monte Cassino: A German View" Cassell, London, 1964 ASIN B000MMKAYM
Brooks, Thomas R. "The War North of Rome (June 1944 – May 1945)" Da Capo Press, 2003 
Donato, Hernâni. "Dicionário das Batalhas Brasileiras" ('Dictionary of Brazilian Battles')  IBRASA, 1987 
Moraes, Mascarenhas de. "The Brazilian Expeditionary Force by Its Commander" US Government Printing Office, 1966 ASIN B000PIBXCG
Soares, Leonércio. "Verdades e vergonhas da Força Expedicionária Brasileira"  Author editing – Curitiba, 1985

See also
Battle of Collecchio

References

World War II operations and battles of the Italian Campaign
Battles of World War II involving Brazil
Battles of World War II involving Germany
Battles of World War II involving the United States
1944 in Italy
1945 in Italy